Tragopogon dubius (yellow salsify, western salsify, western goat's-beard, wild oysterplant, yellow goat's beard, goat's beard, goatsbeard, common salsify, salsify) is a species of salsify native to southern and central Europe and western Asia and found as far north and west as northern France.  Although it has been reported from Kashmir and India, recent evidence suggests that specimens from these areas may be a different species. Western salsify has been introduced into North America where it has become widespread, being reported from all the continental United States except for a few in the far south-east, and all provinces of Canada except Newfoundland and the northern territories.

Like most salsifies, the western salsify grows as an annual or occasionally biennial forb, reaching a height of typically 20–60 cm but sometimes almost a metre.  It grows typically in warm, sheltered spots with moist soil.  Its yellow flower head is 4–6 cm in diameter and is likely to be seen in late spring or early summer.  Buds are blue-green, tall, and tapered. The inflorescence opens early in the morning and often closes up by late afternoon.  Later the plant forms a seed head that resembles that of the dandelions but is distinctly larger.  The seeds themselves (known as achenes) are 2–4 cm long but featherweight, weighing about 8 mg each on average.  There is some natural variation between the central and peripheral achenes in the seedhead, with the peripheral ones being generally darker and heavier, and having a higher concentration of phenolic compounds; this may enhance their survival potential.

Western salsify is quite similar to the generally more common meadow salsify, T. pratensis, but the bracts which show behind the flower head, a distinctive feature of salsifies, are longer and more noticeable.  Although not particularly closely related to meadow salsify or the common salsify or oyster plant (T. porrifolius), the western salsify hybridises readily with both, and in North America its hybrids have given rise to the new alloploid hybrid species T. mirus and T. miscellus.

Because western salsify is a widespread plant, it has a large number of alternative common names.  They include western goat's beard, wild oysterplant, yellow salsify, yellow goat's beard, meadow goat's beard, goat's beard, goatsbeard, common salsify, or salsify.  Some of these are also, or more commonly, used for other species, and are better avoided.  A synonym, Tragopogon major, may also be encountered.

The basal leaves can be eaten raw or cooked. Native Americans ate the roots, which are best cooked, and are said to taste like oysters.

References

Further reading
Mavrodiev, E. V., Nawchoo, I., Soltis, D. E., & Soltis, P. S. (2006). Molecular data reveal that the allotetraploid Tragopogon kashmirianus Singh, a narrow endemic of Kashmir, is distinct from the North American T. mirus.  Poster presented at the conference of the Botanical Society of America.
Mavrodiev, E. V., Tancig, M., Sherwood, A. M., et al. (2005).  Phylogeny of Tragopogon L. (Asteraceae) based on internal and external transcribed spacer sequence data.  International Journal of Plant Sciences, 166, 117–133.
Maxwell, C. D., Zobel, A., & Woodfine, D. (1994).  Somatic polymorphism in the achenes of Tragopogon dubius.  Canadian Journal of Botany, 72, 1282–1288.
Soltis, D. E., Soltis, P. S., Pires, J. C., Kovarik, A., Tate, J. A., & Mavrodiev, E. (2004).  Recent and recurrent polyploidy in Tragopogon (Asteraceae): cytogenetic, genomic and genetic comparisons.  Biological Journal of the Linnean Society, 82, 485–501.

External links
Jepson Manual treatment of the species
Pictures from the CalPhotos archive
Plants for a Future database entry for the species

dubius
Edible plants